3160 may refer to:

In general
 A.D. 3160, a year in the 4th millennium CE
 3160 BC, a year in the 4th millennium BCE
 3160, a number in the 3000 (number) range

Roads numbered 3160
 Hawaii Route 3160, a state highway
 Kentucky Route 3160, a state highway
 Louisiana Highway 3160, a state highway
 Texas Ranch to Market Road 3160, a state highway

Other uses
 3160 Angerhofer, an asteroid in the Asteroid Belt, the 3160th asteroid registered

See also

 , a WWI U.S. Navy refrigerated cargo ship